Feed is a 2005 Australian crime-horror film directed by Brett Leonard. The plot involves a police investigation of non-consensual feederism. The film explores themes of love, dominance and submission.

Plot
Australian cop, Phillip (Patrick Thompson) works as a cybercrime investigator for Interpol but is left shaken after investigating a case in Hamburg, Germany in which a man consented to having his own penis cut off and eaten by his lover. Phillip's own relationship is also troubled due to his frequent travel and difficulties with romantic intimacy, and he finds himself unable to respond positively to his beautiful girlfriend's sexual overtures. The two have rough sex that gets out of hand, and she leaves him after writing "pig" on his chest with lipstick.

Meanwhile, Phillip has been working with his partner, Nigel (Matthew Le Nevez), to investigate a fetish website that features morbidly obese women being held captive and fed fattening food. The website's intricate encryption suggests that the webmaster is concealing a deeper perversion and, despite the objections of his superiors, Phillip travels to Toledo, Ohio so as to investigate the webmaster and determine the whereabouts of "Lucy", a former site favorite. In Ohio, the site's sadistic webmaster, Michael Carter (Alex O'Loughlin), holds Deidre (Gabby Millgate) captive in a ramshackle cottage in the woods. After questioning a local priest, Michael's adoptive sister and his thin, attractive wife, Phillip manages to track Michael to the cottage, where the latter is preparing to feed Deidre a thick slurry of eggs and weight gain powder. Phillip learns that Michael developed a sexual fascination with obese women due to his troubled relationship with his overweight, immobile mother, who died when he was a child. He also uncovers the twist in Michael's fetish website: Not only are paying site members able to watch him feed and fornicate with obese women, but they can place bets on when each woman will die, using posted statistics on their body proportions, blood pressure, and other medical indicators.

In the cottage, Phillip finds Lucy's decaying remains and then confronts Michael who reveals that he killed his mother and fed Lucy until she died. The slurry-like preparation he was attempting to feed Deidre through a tube contains some of the fat he'd carved from Lucy's body. After a struggle, Phillip shoots Deidre, who maintains her love for Michael even as Philip tells her about his deceptions, and two shots can be heard off screen.

The final scene reveals Phillip living in suburban bliss with Michael's overweight adoptive sister. He takes some sandwiches she has packed for him and drives to the cottage in the woods, where he eats them with gusto, pausing to tantalize Michael, who is in a wheelchair, with one. Michael, starving and emaciated, begs Phillip to "feed [him]."

Cast
 Alex O'Loughlin as Michael Carter
 Patrick Thompson as Phillip Jackson
 Gabby Millgate as Deidre
 Jack Thompson as Richard
 Rose Ashton as Abbey
 Matthew Le Nevez as Nigel
 David Field as Father Turner

Reception
On Rotten Tomatoes, the film has a 57% rating based on 7 critic reviews.

References

External links
 
 
 

2005 films
2000s crime films
2005 independent films
2005 psychological thriller films
Australian thriller films
2000s English-language films
2000s German-language films
Fat fetishism
Films directed by Brett Leonard
Films set in Australia
Films set in Toledo, Ohio
Films shot in Australia
Films shot in Ohio
Australian independent films
Police detective films
Australian serial killer films
Films about cannibalism